The consumer price index (CPI) is the official measure of inflation in South Africa. One variant, the consumer price index excluding mortgage costs (CPIX), is officially targeted by the South African Reserve Bank and a primary measure that determines national interest rates.

Measured variants
In total there are six measured variants of CPI based on data drawn from two different geographic sets: metropolitan areas only and both metropolitan and other urban areas. The Core and Food indexes are compiled across both geographic sets. The All Items index is compiled only for metropolitan areas. CPI minus mortgage costs (CPIX) is compiled only for both metropolitan and urban areas.

All items index 
The All Items index encompasses 12 categories of consumer expenses:
 Food and non-alcoholic beverages
 Alcoholic beverages and tobacco
 Clothing and footwear
 Housing and utilities
 Household contents, equipment and maintenance
 Health
 Transport
 Communication
 Recreation and culture
 Education
 Restaurants and hotels
 Miscellaneous goods and services, including insurance and financial services

Core index 
The Core index excludes five price sets considered to be particularly volatile. These are:
 Fresh and frozen meat and fish (excluded because of climatic volatility);
 Fresh and frozen vegetables and fresh fruit and nuts (excluded because of seasonal volatility);
 Overdrafts/personal loans (excluded because of a "perverse effect on the CPI");
 Changes in Value Added Tax (excluded because VAT rates are set by government fiscal policy);
 Property tax assessment rates (excluded because rates are set by local government).

Food index
The Food index is derived by excluding everything but food from the CPI basket of goods and services. The food section of the basket includes eight food categories plus non-alcoholic beverages and a miscellaneous category for condiments and spices.

CPIX
CPIX is measured by excluding one section of the CPI basket of goods and services, the owner's equivalent rent, from the calculation.

January 2009 changes
In January 2009 Statistics South Africa changed the naming and composition of headline CPI measures, effectively replacing CPIX as the measure for government inflation targeting. The weighting of items in the basket was also changed, with certain items excluded and new items introduced, and a broader range of prices are collected for individual items. Data for the revamped index had been collected since January 2008 in order to provide immediate historic comparisons after the change. However, as many legal agreements refer to the previous baseline measures, these continue to be published.

See also
Consumer price index by country

Notes

References

External links
Statistics South Africa CPI review project page

Economy of South Africa
Price indices